Record sealing is the practice of sealing or, in some cases, destroying court records that would otherwise be publicly accessible as public records. The term is derived from the tradition of placing a seal on specified files or documents that prevents anyone from reviewing the files without receiving a court order. The modern process and requirements to seal a record and the protections it provides vary from jurisdiction to jurisdiction, and even between civil and criminal cases.

Generally, record sealing can be defined as the process of removing from general review the records pertaining to a court case. However, the records may not completely disappear and may still be reviewed under limited circumstances; in most instances, it requires a court order to unseal records once they are sealed. In the United States, some states order records to be destroyed after they are sealed. Once a record is sealed, in some states, the contents are legally considered never to have occurred and are not acknowledged by the state.

The public policy of record sealing balances the desire to free named citizens from the burdens caused by the information contained in state records while maintaining the state's interest in the preservation of records that may be beneficial to the state or other citizens.

In many cases, a person with a sealed record gains the legal right to deny or not acknowledge anything to do with the arrest and the legal proceedings from the case itself.

Records are commonly sealed in a number of situations:
Sealed birth records (typically after adoption or determination of paternity)
Juvenile criminal records may be sealed
Other types of cases involving juveniles may be sealed, anonymized, or pseudonymized ("impounded"); e.g., child sex offense or custody cases
Cases using witness protection information may be partly sealed
Cases involving trade secrets
Cases involving state secrets

Filing under seal in US  court

Normally, records should not be filed under seal without a court permission. However, FRCP 5.2 requires that sensitive text – like Social Security number, Taxpayer Identification Number, birthday, bank accounts, and children’s names – should be redacted off the filings made with the court and accompanying exhibits. A person making a redacted filing can file an unredacted copy under seal, or the Court can choose to order later that an additional filing be made under seal without redaction. Alternately, the filing party may ask the court’s permission to file some exhibits completely under seal.

When the document is filed "under seal", it should have a clear indication for the court clerk to file it separately – most often by stamping words "Filed Under Seal" on the bottom of each page. Person making filing should also provide instructions to the court clerk that the document needs to be filed "under seal". Courts often have specific requirements to these filings in their Local Rules.

Ongoing litigation
A Delaware background check corporation by the name of IntegraScan has filed for Declaratory Relief in both the states of Texas and New Jersey. The position of IntegraScan is that state mandated record sealing and expungements do not apply to private corporations, only state and Federal run agencies. The contention of the suits are that record sealing and expungement orders applied to corporations and private citizens violate First Amendment rights.

Difference from expungement 
Expungement, which is a physical destruction, namely a complete erasure of one's criminal records, and therefore usually carries a higher standards, differs from record sealing, which is only to restrict the public's access to records, so that only certain law enforcement agencies or courts, under special circumstances, will have access to them. A record seal will greatly improve the chance of employment, as employers will not have access to damning records. There are occasions, like expungement, where one can truthfully state under oath that they have never been convicted before.

Most of the time, a record seal has more relaxed requirements than an expungement. If an expungement is not allowed with a case, then sealing a record may be the best bet. Different states have different terms for what constitutes sealing of a record.

See also
Sealed birth records

References

Judicial legal terminology
Legal procedure
Privacy law
Public records
Common law legal terminology